Bratislavskaya may refer to:

 Bratislavskaya (Moscow Metro)
 Bratislavskaya (street)
 Bratyslavska (Kyiv Metro)